Drastic Measures is the second studio album by American electronic musician Bayonne. It was released on February 22, 2019 through Mom + Pop Music.

Track listing

Charts

References

2019 albums
Bayonne (musician) albums
Mom + Pop Music albums